The 2022 Kentucky Wildcats football team represented the University of Kentucky in the 2022 NCAA Division I FBS football season. The Wildcats played their home games at Kroger Field in Lexington, Kentucky, and competed in the Eastern Division of the Southeastern Conference (SEC). They were led by tenth-year head coach Mark Stoops.

Schedule
Kentucky and the SEC announced the 2022 football schedule on September 21, 2021.

Coaching staff

Game summaries

Miami (OH)

Sources:

at No. 12 Florida

Sources:

Youngstown State

Sources:

Northern Illinois

Sources:

at No. 14 Ole Miss

Sources:

South Carolina

Sources:

No. 16 Mississippi State

Sources:

at No. 3 Tennessee

Sources:

at Missouri

Sources:

Vanderbilt

Sources:

No. 1 Georgia

Sources:

No. 25 Louisville

Sources:

vs. Iowa

Sources:

Rankings

References

Kentucky
Kentucky Wildcats football seasons
Kentucky Wildcats football